Ben Van Os (1 December 1944 – 2 July 2012) was a Dutch production designer and art director. He received two Academy Award for Best Art Direction nominations for his works in Orlando (1993) and Girl with a Pearl Earring (2003). The latter of which also earned him a BAFTA Award for Best Production Design nomination.

Selected filmography
 Orlando (1992)
 Girl with a Pearl Earring (2003)

References

External links

1944 births
2012 deaths
Art directors
Production designers
Mass media people from The Hague
Deaths from cancer in the Netherlands